The women's scratch competition at the 2020  UEC European Track Championships was held on 11 November 2020. Hanna Tserakh of Belarus attacked with 13 laps to go and stayed in the front until the end, however Martina Fidanza of Italy accelerated with  two laps to go, managing to overtake Tserakh right on the line, taking the title.

Results
First rider across the line without a net lap loss wins.

References

Women's scratch
European Track Championships – Women's scratch